Tarn Taran Sahib is a city in the Majha region of the state of Punjab, in northern India. It is the district headquarters and hosts the municipal council of Tarn Taran district. Gurdwara Sri Tarn Taran Sahib, a prominent Sikh shrine is located in the central part of the city.

History
Tarn Taran Sahib was founded by the Fifth Sikh Guru, Shri Guru Arjan Dev Ji (1563–1606). He was so enchanted by its natural beauty that he established a town and named it Tarn Taran, the boat to cross the ocean of existence and to enjoy the blessings of almighty God. He laid the foundation of Sri Tarn Taran Sahib Temple.
Tarn Taran Sahib was part of the Bhangi Sikh Dynasty ruled by a powerful Jatt family of the Dhillon Clan from 1716 to 1810.

In 1947, the year of the Partition of India and the Partition of Punjab, Tarn Taran was the only tehsil (district) in Punjab, along with Shiekhupura, Ludhiana, Jalandhar, Hoshiapur, Kapurthala, Patti, Amritsar, Lyallpur, and Patiala, with a majority Sikh population. The city was the center of the Sikh insurgency during the 1980s and early 1990s. The main occupation in this area is agriculture and agroindustry, with very few other industries.

Tarn Taran district was formed in 2006. The declaration to this effect was made by Captain Amarinder Singh, Chief Minister of Punjab, during the celebrations marking the martyrdom day of Sri Guru Arjan Dev Ji. With this, it became the 19th district of Punjab.

Ranjit Singh and Nau Nihal Singh

Maharaja Ranjit Singh had the steps on the two sides of the sarovar, formerly left unfinished by Budh Singh and Jassa Singh Ahluwalia, completed and its circumambulatory passage paved. The Darbar Sahib was also reconstructed. Maharaja Ranjit Singh and his grandson, Kanvar Nau Nihal Singh, donated large quantities of gold to have the exterior plated with the metal, but the work made little progress in the troubled times that followed Ranjit Singh's death. It was in the last quarter of the nineteenth century that part of the exterior was covered with goldleaf by Sant Sham Singh, of Amritsar. Only one of the four towers planned by Kanvar Nau Nihal Singh for the four corners of the tank was erected during this time. Under Maharaja Ranjit Singh's orders, the town of Tarn Taran was enclosed by a wall. A few other shrines, such as the Mahji Sahib, the Akal Bunga and the Guru ka Khuh, were developed and several bungas added.

Tarn Taran and the British Raj

After the annexation of the Punjab to the British dominions, the management of the shrines at Tarn Taran, along with those at Amritsar, was entrusted to a sarbarah, or manager, appointed by the deputy commissioner of Amritsar. The role of the manager was, however, confined to general supervision, the priests being autonomous in the conduct of religious affairs. They divided the offerings among themselves and gradually appropriated most of the lands endowed to the Darbar Sahib during Sikh rule. They neglected their religious duties and cared little for the sanctity of the holy shrines and the sarovar. The traditional monthly congregation on every amavasya day, the last day of the dark half of the month, was reduced to a small carnival. Reforms introduced by the Singh Sabha, Tarn Taran, established in 1885, were disapproved and resisted by the clergy. Efforts of the Khalsa Diwan Majha and the Central Majha Khalsa Diwan to cleanse the administration met with only partial success.

Gurdwara Reform Movement
As the Gurdwara reform movement got under way, the control of the sacred shrines passed to a representative body of the Sikhs, the Shiromani Gurdwara Parbandhak Committee, on 27 January 1921. A leper asylum established by Guru Arjan Dev (it was thought that minerals in the water were helpful in treating Leprosy), but completely ignored by the clergy after the abrogation of Sikh sovereignty, was taken over in 1858 by Christian missionaries.

Demographics
 Indian census, Tarn Taran Sahib had a population of 66,847. Males constituted 52.3% of the population, and females 47.7%. Tarn Taran has an average literacy rate of 79.33%, higher than the state average of 75.84%: male literacy was 82.39%, and female literacy was 76%. In Tarn Taran Sahib, 11.2% of the population was under 6 years of age and 15% is elderly. 3% of its residents have settled abroad.

Politics 
The city is part of the Tarn Taran Assembly Constituency. Kashmir Singh Sohal from Aam Admi Party is the MLA elected in 2022 Punjab Legislative Assembly election.

Culture

Hub of Sikh culture
The city has many historical gurdwaras which include: Darbar Sahib Sri Guru Arjan Dev Ji, Gurdwara Guru Ka Khuh (Gurdwara of the Guru's Well), Gurdwara Bibi Bhani Da Khuh, Gurdwara Takkar Sahib, Gurdwara Lakeer Sahib, Gurudwara Baba Garja Singh Baba Bota Singh, Gurdwara Jhulna Mahal, and Lalpur (Tapeana Sahib).

The main religious hub at Tarn Taran Sahib is Sri Darbar Sahib Tarn Taran, built by Sri Guru Arjan Dev Ji. The Gurdwara Sri Darbar Sahib Tarn Taran has the largest sarovar (holy tank) in the world.

Gurdwara Darbar Sahib (Tarn Taran) - This gurdwara is an elegant, three-storeyed structure at the southeastern corner of the sarovar. Approached through a double-storeyed arched gateway, it stands in the middle of a marble-floored platform. The upper portion of the edifice is covered with glittering gold-plated sheets. The lotus dome, damaged in an earthquake (4 April 1905) and subsequently reconstructed, has an ornamental gold pinnacle with an umbrella-shaped gold finial. Exquisitely executed stucco work in intricate designs, inset with reflecting glass pieces, decorate the interior walls and the ceiling. The Guru Granth Sahib is seated on a platform under an elongated dome covered with goldplated metal sheets. This throne was an offering from Kanvar Nau Nihal Singh. A relay recital of Kirtan goes on from early morning until late in the evening.

Har Ki Pauri -
A flight of marbled steps behind the Darbar Sahib descending into the sacred pool, marks the spot where, according to tradition, Guru Arjan made the first cut as the digging started in 1590. Pilgrims go down these steps to take Charanamrit or palmsful of holy water to sip.

The Sarovar -
One of the largest of the Sikh holy tanks (ponds), it is an approximate rectangle in shape. The sarovar was originally fed by rain water that flowed in from the surrounding lands. In 1833, Maharaja Raghubir Singh of Jmd had a water channel dug, connecting the tank with the Lower Kasur Branch of the Upper Ban Doab Canal at Rasulpur watermills,  to the southeast. The channel was cemented and covered in 1927/28 by Sant Gurmukh Singh and Sant Sadhu Singh. They also supervised karseva, i.e. complete desilting of the tank through voluntary service, in 1931. The operation was repeated in 1970 under Sant Jivan Singh. Most of the bungas around the sarovar have now been demolished and a verandah constructed instead along the periphery. The name Tarn Taran, since appropriated by the town itself, originally belonged to the sarovar, so called by Guru Arjan. Literally it means, "the boat that takes one across (the ocean of existence)". (Tarana in Sanskrit is a raft or a boat). According to Sikh tradition, the water of the old pond was found to possess medicinal properties, especially efficacious for curing leprosy. For this reason the sarovar was known as Dukh Nivaran, the eradicator of affliction. AKAL BUNGA, a four storeyed building near the Nishan Sahib (Sikh flagpole), was constructed in 1841 by Kanvar Nau Nihal Singh. Maharaja Sher Singh provided the finishing touches. The Guru Granth Sahib, "after a procession around the sarovar amid" chanting of hymns in the late evening, is, brought here for the night's rest. Manji Sahib, a small domed shrine in the eastern part of the circumambulatory pavement, marks the spot from where Guru Arjan supervised the excavation of the sarovar. A divan hall, a vast pavilion of reinforced concrete, has now been raised close to it.

The Tower -
The only completed column of the four planned by Kanvar Nau Nihal Singh, for the beautification of the sarovar at Tarn Taran, stands at the northeastern corner. The dome on top of it was added later.

Gurdwara Lakeer Sahib is situated at the place where a line on the ground was marked by Baba Deep Singh Ji, before entering into war against the Mughal Empire in 1757. Gurudwara Bibi Bhani da Khuh, situated near Sri Darbar Sahib Tarn Taran, is named after Bibi Bhani Ji. She was the daughter of Guru Amar Das, the wife of Guru Ram Das, and the mother of Guru Arjan Dev Ji. This religio-historic khuh (well) was dug by Guru Arjan Dev Ji, in memory of his mother, at the place where she used to serve food, water, and medicine to the needy and visiting pilgrims. Locals preserved the place with the help of Dera Kar Sewa Tarn Taran, and constructed a gurdwara.

Gurdwara Guru Ka Khuh is also situated in Tarn Taran City. This well belonged to Guru Arjan Dev Ji, and a historic gurdwara has been built at this place.

Other gurdwaras in the District of Tarn Taran are at Goindwal Sahib, namely Gurdwara Baoli Sahib, at Khadoor Sahib, at Baba Buddha Sahib (Bir Sāhib) and those  at Amritsar. It is an important center of Sikhism, as Guru Arjan Dev ji was born there.

Economy

Industry
Tarn Taran has many smaller-scale to large-scale industries:

 Rana Sugar Distilleries (Village Lokha)
 Cooperative sugar mill (Village Sheron)
 World Famous Fish Market (Village Harike)
 Asia Largest Poultry Farm (VillageGagobuha)
 Ambition Poltary Farm (VillageRure Asal)
 Tarn Taran Grain Market (one of the India's Biggest Grain markets)
 Tarn Taran district have about 58 Rice Shellers
 Goindwal Sahib Power Plant 540 MW (2x270 MW) power plant by GVK Industries.
 Spinning Mills Goindwal Sahib
 Thread Mills Goindwal Sahib
 Lt Foods Ltd

The central government has plans for setting up a special economic zone (SEZ) at Sri Goindwal Sahib.

Infrastructure

Air
The nearest airport is Amritsar International Airport. Domestic connections are available to almost every major city of India.

Rail 

Tarn Taran is well-connected with nearby cities and villages with the rail network.

Tarn Taran station is located on the Amritsar-to-Khemkaran line.

A rail line from Tarn Taran sahib to Goindwal Sahib has been recently constructed and a new project of rail from Patti to Ferozpur is under construction.

Road

Tarn Taran is connected by roads to many other locations:    
 to Amritsar, Pathankot, Jammu
 to Patti, Khemkaran
 to Kapurthala, Jalandhar
 to Jandiala Guru, Beas
 to Bathinda, Bikaner
 to Chabhal, Attari/Wagha
 to Khadur Sahib, Goindwal Sahib
 to Mohanpura
 to Shahbajpur, Punjab

Tarn Taran is located on the historic Royal Highway (Sher Shah Suri Marg) of the Mugal Empire from Delhi to Lahore. NH-15 (National Highway No. 15) also passes through Tarn Taran. It has a fast bus service to Amritsar, with a daily route of about 450 buses daily.

AC coach buses of many transports have routes of Tarn Taran, including PUNBUS, PRTC, RAJ, and NEW DEEP.

Daily bus services run to and from New Delhi, Chandigarh, Patiala, Bikaner, Bathinda, Ferozpur, Ludhiana, and Jalandhar.

There is weekly bus service to Ponta Sahib.

Schools

1 Maharaja Ranjit Singh Public School
2 Sri Guru Harkrishan Public School
3 St. Francis Convent School
4 Mamta Niketan Convent School
5 St. Thomas Convent School
6 Guru Arjun Dev Khalsa School
7 Punjab Children Academy
8 Cupid's School
9 Mata Ganga Girls School
10 SD Sen Sec Public School
11 Sant Singh Sukha Singh Public School
12 SSS Public School
13 Arya Girls School
14 Govt. Sen Sec School
15 Guru Nanak Dev Academy
16 Majha Public School.
17 SD Girls High School
18 Universal Academy
19 SBDS Sen Sec School Patti
20 Shri Mahavir Jain Model High School Patti
21 S.B.B.S Sen Sec School Rasulpur 
22 Baba Deep Singh Public School
23 Guru Amar Dass Adarsh Institute Goindwal sahib
24 Guru Amar Dass senior secondary school Goindwal sahib

Colleges

1 Guru Arjun Dev Khalsa College
2 Sewa Devi College
3 Mata Ganga College for women
4 Majha College for women
5 Kalian Homeopathic College
6 Mai Bhago Institute of Nursing
7 Shiv Shankar Institute of Engg and Tech (Patti)
8 Shaheed Bhagat Singh Pharmacy (Patti)
9 Shaheed Bhagat Singh Polytechnic College
10 Shaheed Bhagat Singh B.Ed College
11 International School of Nursing
12. Goutam college Tarn Taran
13 Guru Gobind Singh Khalsa College  Sarhali

Overview
Tarn Taran is a Municipal Council city in district of Tarn Taran, Punjab. The Tarn Taran
No of Distt Wards 19 Which Has Been Included City and Some Of Neae Area's.

Tarn Taran Municipal Council has total administration over 12,874 houses to which it supplies basic amenities like water and sewerage. It is also authorize to build roads within Municipal Council limits and impose taxes on properties coming under its jurisdiction.

Health
The city has adequate health care system The city has one Civil (public) hospital besides six private hospitals. Tarn Taran has a largest 350 Bedded fully computerized Charitable Hospital viz. Guru Nanak Dev Super-speciality Hospital, run under 'Baba Jiwan Singh Baba Dalip Singh Educational Trust'(regd.). Baba Jagtar Singh Kar Sewa Wale is the Chairman. 
The Hospital has got all core medical facilities with state of art Radiology and Pathology Departments.

Government and politics
Tarn Taran Sahib is situated near the Amritsar district. It sends one elected representative to the Lok Sabha (the Indian parliament), one member to the State Legislative Assembly and two members to Shiromani Gurdwara Parbhandhak Committee(SGPC) at Amritsar. It is the headquarters of Tarn Taran district. It is a municipal council with 19 wards. The district borders Doaba, Malwa Belt and Pakistan.

Tourism 

Visitor attractions in and around Tarn Taran Sahib include:

 Gurdwara Beed Baba Budda Sahib, located on Chaabal - Amritsar road
 Gurdwara Goindwal Sahib
 Gurdwara Khadoor Sahib is situated in the Khadoor Sahib city in Taran Taaran Distt.
 Harike Wetland, home to a wide range of flora and fauna
 Gurdwara Dukh Niwarn Sahib, Village Thathi-Khara, Tarn Taran
Haveli at jandiala

Notable people
Baba Deep Singhji, Sikh martyr
Baba Gurdit Singh, SS Komagata Maru
Bhai Bidhi Chand Chhina, Warrior
Bhai Maha Singh, Sikh martyr
Dara Singh, wrestler
Deepak Dhawan Social Activist, Communist leader
Gurdial Singh Dhillon, ex-speaker of Lok Sabha, India
Gurpreet Singh (shooter), winner of two medals in Commonwealth Games, Delhi
M. S. Gill, former chief Election Commissioner of India and former sports Minister of India
Mai Bhago, Sikh martyr
Pratap Singh Kairon, ex-Chief Minister of Punjab
Krishan Kant former Vice-President of India
Surender Mohan Pathak, Novelist
Teja Singh Samundri, founder of SGPC
Baba Baghel Singh, who occupied Delhi
BabaSohan Singh Bhakna, Founder and President of Gadar party
Gurbaksh Chahal, entrepreneur and writer
Prem Dhillon, Punjabi Singer 
Jordan Sandhu, Punjabi Singer
Paintal, Indian actor

References

External links
Cal-C Computer education
Darbarsahibtarntaran.com Website created by navdeep singh chandi (navi kamboj)
"La et capsule soch lo", LATimes.com, 27 August 2010.

 
Cities and towns in Tarn Taran district